Lemley-Wood-Sayer House is a historic home located at Ravenswood, Jackson County, West Virginia. It was built in 1871, and is a two-story, cruciform plan, Italianate style dwelling.  It is constructed of brick and sits on a stone foundation.  It features a wraparound porch supported by seven columns that are heavy with ornamental bracketing, or gingerbreading.

It was listed on the National Register of Historic Places in 1985.

References

Houses on the National Register of Historic Places in West Virginia
Italianate architecture in West Virginia
Houses completed in 1871
Houses in Jackson County, West Virginia
National Register of Historic Places in Jackson County, West Virginia